Gordon Noel Humphreys (1883–1966) was a British born surveyor, pilot, botanist, explorer and doctor. Originally trained as a surveyor, Humphreys worked in both Mexico and Uganda. During World War I he served as a pilot with the Royal Flying Corps, was shot down and spent his internment training himself in botany.

Oxford University Ellesmere Land Expedition
After the war it was his survey work and exploration of the Ruwenzori Range in Uganda that brought him to the attention of Edward Shackleton. Humphreys was chosen as the leader and head surveyor of the "Oxford University Ellesmere Land Expedition" (OUELE) by Shackleton, who was the organiser of the expedition. Consisting of Shackleton, photographer and biologist A. W. Moore (sometimes listed as Morris), H. W. Stallworthy of the Royal Canadian Mounted Police, geologist Robert Bentham and ornithologist David Haig-Thomas, along with their Greenland Inuit guides, Inutuk and Nukapinguaq, they set up camp at Etah, Greenland, in 1934.

From the camp Inutuk, Nukapinguaq, Stallworthy and Moore proceeded to Lake Hazen on Ellesmere Island, Canada, where they set up camp. From there Moore and Nukapinguaq continued up the Gilman Glacier and then made the first known ascent of Mount Oxford.

From the summit they could see a mountain range that the "great imperialist" (as Humphreys was called by Shackleton in 1937) named the British Empire Range.

By the end of May 1935 the group had returned to Etah and to England in late September the same year.

Mount Everest
In 1936 Humphreys was a member of the 6th British Expedition to attempt to climb Mount Everest. Included in the party were Eric Shipton and Tenzing Norgay.

Retirement
Humphreys retired to Devon and died there in 1966.

External links & references
Expedition members listing Morris instead of Moore
Expedition members listing Moore rather than Morris
Extract from "Oxford University Ellesmere Land Expedition: Discussion"
Gordon Noel Humphreys short biography
6th British Everest Expedition
Geographical Names of the Ellesmere Island National Park Reserve and Vicinity by Geoffrey Hattersley-Smith (1998)  

1883 births
English mountain climbers
Explorers of the Arctic
British explorers of North America
Explorers of Canada
1966 deaths
Royal Flying Corps officers